Viacom Productions (formerly 	Viacom Enterprises) was a television production arm of Viacom International. Viacom Enterprises was also a movie production, and a sports production. The division was active from 1971 until 2004, when the company was folded into Paramount Network Television 10 years following Viacom's acquisition of Paramount Pictures, and led Perry Simon to move itself to Paramount for a production deal.

History 
Viacom Enterprises was formed in 1971 as the successor of the pre-1968 CBS Films, later reincorporated as CBS Enterprises, Inc. in 1968. In 1973, it was spun-off because it was against the FCC regulations for a television network to distribute its programs under its own name. Subsequently, Viacom formed "Viacom Productions" to produce first-run television series airing on the major television networks.

The first primetime television show, movie, or sports to be produced by Viacom Productions for the ABC network was The MacKenzies of Paradise Cove. The studio had development contracts with independent writers and producers. The studio made significant deals in 1977, when Roland Kibbee and Dean Hargrove left Universal for Viacom.

In 1984, Thomas D. Tannenbaum became president of the studio.

On March 11, 1994, Viacom acquired Paramount Communications, Inc. and Viacom Enterprises was folded into Paramount Domestic Television, by transferring the domestic rights of the Viacom library. Viacom International was later reorganized as the parent company of MTV Networks and Showtime Networks. Viacom transferred the international rights of the said library into Paramount International Television, while Viacom Productions was reincorporated as a production sub-division of Paramount Television. The first hit came after the acquisition was Sabrina, the Teenage Witch, a show ABC aired from 1996 to 2000, followed by a run on The WB from 2000 to 2003.

Viacom Productions was folded into Paramount Network Television in 2004, amid financial troubles brought on to Viacom. The final two series to end under the Viacom Productions name are Ed and The Division.

Viacom Pictures 

From 1991 to 1995, Viacom Productions produced some theatrical films and television films under the brand Viacom Pictures. Viacom Pictures was shut down a year after its parent acquired Paramount Communications, the parent of Paramount Pictures.

Shows produced by Viacom Productions
Among select titles

Note
The 4400 continued as a Paramount Network Television production for season 2. The show became a CBS Paramount Network Television production for its last two seasons after the Viacom/CBS split at the end of 2005.

All shows from Viacom Productions are now owned by CBS Studios Productions, LLC., a holding company, and distributed by CBS Television Distribution.

See also
Paramount Television
CBS Studios, formerly CBS Paramount Television and CBS Television Studios
CBS Media Ventures, formerly CBS Television Distribution
Viacom Enterprises
Viacom (1952–2006)

References

Television production companies of the United States
Entertainment companies based in California
Companies based in Los Angeles
Entertainment companies established in 1974
Mass media companies established in 1974
Mass media companies disestablished in 2004
American companies established in 1974
American companies disestablished in 2004
1974 establishments in California
2004 disestablishments in California
Paramount Global subsidiaries
Predecessors of CBS Studios

nl:Viacom Productions